The 2006 APRA Silver Scroll Awards were held on Wednesday 20 September 2006 at the Auckland Town Hall, celebrating excellence in New Zealand songwriting. The Silver Scroll Award was presented to Don McGlashan for his song "Bathe In the River", originally performed by the Mt Raskil Preservation Society for the soundtrack of the New Zealand film No. 2. This was the final year where winners were selected by genre-specific panels of judges.

Silver Scroll Award 

The Silver Scroll Award celebrates outstanding achievement in songwriting of original New Zealand pop music. The evening's music performances were produced by composers Victoria Kelly and Joost Langeveld. Each of the nominated songs were covered in a new style by another artist.

Other awards 

Four other awards were presented at the Silver Scroll Awards: APRA Maioha Award (for excellence in contemporary Maori music), SOUNZ Contemporary Award (for creativity and inspiration in classical composition) and two awards acknowledging songs with the most radio and television play in New Zealand and overseas.

APRA Maioha Award

SOUNZ Contemporary Award

Most Performed Works

APRA song awards 

Outside of the Silver Scroll Awards, APRA presented two genre awards in 2006. The APRA Best Pacific Song was presented at the Pacific Music Awards and the APRA Best Country Music Song was presented at the New Zealand Country Music Awards.

References 

New Zealand music awards
APRA